Argentina is currently facing the largest locust swarm within the past 60 years. According to Diego Quiroga, Argentina's agriculture agency’s chief of vegetative protection, said that it is impossible to eradicate the swarm, so they are focusing on minimizing the damage caused by it by sending out fumigators equipped with backpack sprayers to exterminate small pockets of young locusts that are still unable to fly. This method of extermination, however, is unable to wipe out pocket of locusts hidden in Argentina's large, dry forests. The swarm covers an area the size of 5,000 sq. km in Northern Argentina. The locusts are expected to grow ten inches and mature into flying swarms by February fifth.

The locusts first appeared in small areas in June 2015. The mild Winter aided their population growth, allowing it to reach its current size. This swarm is reported to be the largest within 60 years despite last year's swarm being reported four miles in length and two miles in height. A swarm of this size is worrisome to Argentinians because locusts, a relative of grasshoppers, attack farmers' crops and can cause famine and starvation. This behavior is more pronounced when the locust population density is higher due to a trait called locust phase polyphenism, so it stands to reason that a larger swarm will be more aggressive than a smaller one.

Currently, there are over one hundred outbreaks of locusts that have affected over an area of 700,000 hectares (roughly 2700 square miles). The infestation is so bad that SENASA, the government agricultural inspection agency, has set up a hotline for people to call if they see any locusts.

References 

Argentina 2016
Argentinean locust swarm
Locust swarm 2016
Locust swarm
Argentinean locust swarm